AfroBasket 2015 was the 28th edition of the AfroBasket, a men's basketball continental championship of Africa. It also served as the qualifying tournament for FIBA Africa at the 2016 Summer Olympics Basketball Tournament in Brazil. The tournament was held in Tunis, Tunisia. The winner qualified for the 2016 Summer Olympics Basketball Tournament.

Nigeria won their first ever AfroBasket, beating Angola in the final 74–65. Chamberlain Oguchi was named tourney MVP.

By winning the title, Nigeria automatically qualified for the 2016 Olympics. The next three best-placed teams, Angola, Tunisia, and Senegal, each secured a spot in the final FIBA World Olympic qualifying tournament.

Qualification

Already qualified:

Defending champions:

Hosts:

Zone 1

Zone 2

Zone 3

Zone 4

Zone 5

Zone 6

Zone 7
None
Wild cards

Venue
AfroBasket 2015 was supposed to have been held in the tourist cities of Nabeul and Hammamet. However, due to the attacks in Sousse in June 2015, the venue was moved to Radès, just outside Tunis.

Squads

Preliminary round

Group A

Group B

Group C

Group D

Final round

Round of 16

Quarterfinals

5th–8th-place semifinals

Semifinals

Fifteenth-place match

Thirteenth-place match

Eleventh-place match

Ninth-place match

Seventh-place match

Fifth-place match

Third-place match

Final

Final rankings

Rewards

All Tournament Team 
  Chamberlain Oguchi (MVP)
  Al-Farouq Aminu 
  Carlos Morais
  Makram Ben Romdhane
  Gorgui Dieng

Partners and sponsors 
 Presenting Partner:  Ooredoo
 Global Partners:  Champion,  Intersport,  Molten Corporation,  Peak Sport Products,  Tissot
 Event Sponsors:  AMI assurance,  Sabrine,  SAÏDA Group,  SEAT

References

External links

 
2015
2015 in African basketball
2015 in Tunisian sport
International basketball competitions hosted by Tunisia
Sports competitions in Radès
21st century in Radès
August 2015 sports events in Africa